In analytic geometry, using the common convention that the horizontal axis represents a variable x and the vertical axis represents a variable y, a y-intercept or vertical intercept is a point where the graph of a function or relation intersects the y-axis of the coordinate system.  As such, these points satisfy x = 0.

Using equations
If the curve in question is given as  the y-coordinate of the y-intercept is found by calculating  Functions which are undefined at x = 0 have no y-intercept.

Multiple y-intercepts
Some 2-dimensional mathematical relationships such as circles, ellipses, and hyperbolas can have more than one y-intercept. Because functions associate x values to no more than one y value as part of their definition, they can have at most one y-intercept.

x-intercepts

Analogously, an x-intercept is a point where the graph of a function or relation intersects with the x-axis.  As such, these points satisfy y=0.  The zeros, or roots, of such a function or relation are the x-coordinates of these x-intercepts.

Unlike y-intercepts, functions of the form y = f(x) may contain multiple x-intercepts. The x-intercepts of functions, if any exist, are often more difficult to locate than the y-intercept, as finding the y intercept involves simply evaluating the function at x=0.

In higher dimensions
The notion may be extended for 3-dimensional space and higher dimensions, as well as for other coordinate axes, possibly with other names. For example, one may speak of the I-intercept of the current–voltage characteristic of, say, a diode. (In electrical engineering, I is the symbol used for electric current.)

See also
Regression intercept

References

Elementary mathematics
Functions and mappings